Bryants Store is an unincorporated community in Knox County, Kentucky, United States. The post office  is active.

References

Unincorporated communities in Knox County, Kentucky
Unincorporated communities in Kentucky